Isanda is a genus of sea snails, marine gastropod mollusks in the family Trochidae, the top snails.

Description
The compact shell of species in this genus has an orbicular-conoidal shape and is porcellanous and polished. The subquadrate aperture is longer than wide, The inner lip is straight, forming an angle with the outer lip. The umbilicus is open (not covered by a callous deposit) and perspective.  The margin is crenulated. The multispiral operculum is corneous. The interior has a very thin nacreous layer.

Species
Species within the genus Isanda include:
 Isanda coronata A. Adams, 1854
 Isanda holdsworthana H. Nevill & G. Nevill, 1871
 Isanda murrea (Reeve, 1848)
Species brought into synonymy
 Isanda crenellifera A. Adams, 1862: synonym of Microthyca crenellifera (A. Adams, 1862)
 Isanda lepida A. Adams, 1853: synonym of Isanda coronata A. Adams, 1854
 Isanda pulchella A. Adams, 1855: synonym of Ethaliella pulchella (A. Adams, 1855)

References

  Arthur Adams, A monograph on Isanda, a new genus of Trochidae allied to Umbonium; Proceedings of the Zoological Society of London pt. 21-23 (1853-1855)
 Williams S.T., Karube S. & Ozawa T. (2008) Molecular systematics of Vetigastropoda: Trochidae, Turbinidae and Trochoidea redefined. Zoologica Scripta 37: 483–506.

 
Trochidae
Gastropod genera